Kristin Booth (born August 28, 1974) is a Canadian actress, born in Kitchener, Ontario. She graduated with Honours BFA from Ryerson Theatre School at Ryerson Polytechnic University in 1997.

Career 
Kristin Booth grew up in Kinkora, near the Shakespeare festival town of Stratford, Ontario. She made her professional acting debut when she was 12, playing an orphan in a summer stock production of Annie. Her first starring role in a movie came with the 2003 heist film Foolproof opposite Ryan Reynolds. In 2008 she made a breakthrough with two performances, as a desperate crack whore in This Beautiful City and a comic turn as part of an ensemble cast of Young People Fucking, for which she was given the Genie Award for best supporting actress. Starting in 2014, she appears in the Hallmark original movie series Signed, Sealed, Delivered as Shane McInerney, a techie postal employee.

In 2018, Booth was one of four actresses who filed lawsuits against Albert Schulz, for sexual harassment allegations related to their time working with him at Soulpepper Theatre.

Filmography

Film

Television

Awards

References

External links

1974 births
Living people
20th-century Canadian actresses
21st-century Canadian actresses
Canadian film actresses
Canadian stage actresses
Canadian television actresses
Best Supporting Actress Genie and Canadian Screen Award winners
Actresses from Kitchener, Ontario
Toronto Metropolitan University alumni
Canadian Comedy Award winners